Thalassius may refer to:

 Thalassius (spider), a synonym of Nilus, a genus of nursery web spiders
 Saint Thalassius, a 5th-century Syrian hermit